is a Japanese community FM radio station in Asaminami-ku, Hiroshima.

Overview
The station was established on January 13, 2009. The broadcasting licence was given by Japan Ministry of Internal Affairs and Communications on March 26, 2009.

The station went on the air on May 11, 2009.

It is operated by the students of Hiroshima University of Economics.

The station name comes from its location of Hiroshima Asa Minamiku and their wish to be a Star of Hiroshima-Asaminami-ku.

The radio broadcast can be received in Asaminami-ku, Higashi-ku, Nishi-ku, Nishi-ku, Asakita-ku, Naka-ku, and Minami-ku in Hiroshima.

References

External links
FM Ham-star (under construction) 
FM Ham-star
Hiroshima University of Economics

Hamster
Radio in Japan
Companies based in Hiroshima Prefecture
Radio stations established in 2009